Altman Lighting, established in 1953, is one of the leading manufacturers of theatrical lighting instruments. They are located in Denver, Colorado, and have been a family-run business since the 1950s. Altman specializes in theatrical lighting and follow spots as well as a series of architectural fixtures.

History
The Altman Stage Lighting Company Inc. was established in 1953 by Charles and Alice Altman. Charles became well known for providing equipment to schools and small theatres with tight budgets. In 1963, Altman Lighting founded Altman Rentals under the leadership of Ronald; Charles and Alice's son. One of Altman's first and most notable inventions was the PAR 64 which they introduced in 1966 for a Rolling Stones concert tour. 
By the 1980s, Altman had become the dominant stage lighting company in North America and in 1988 Charlie and Alice were awarded the Lifetime Achievement Foot Candle Award for their extraordinary achievement in stage lighting. 
In 1990 Alice Altman passed away, and the company was handed over to Robert Altman in 1992. That same year, Altman released a full line of TV and film products. Charles Altman passed in 1995 and his son Robert and grandson Russell now manage factory operations with sales and marketing overseen by Nicolas Champion. 

In June 2020, Altman Lighting relocated to Denver, Colorado after more than 60 years of manufacturing in Yonkers, New York.

Awards
In 1988, Charles and Alice Altman won the Lifetime Achievement Foot Candle Award for their achievement in stage lighting and in 1993 Charles Altman won the Wally Russell award for "outstanding contribution to the entertainment industry".
In 1997 Altman received the Theatre Crafts International Award, which honors new and innovative technical achievement for their focusing cyc light. The next year, Altman won the EDDY award, which recognizes "outstanding contribution to the field of entertainment technology", for the Star PAR luminaire.
In 2004, Altman received the Star Magazine Technology and Business award for their ability to implement technology to solve critical business challenges. Then in 2005, Altman won the Lightfair international Award for Smart Track, a system they had introduced the year before.  In 2013 the Phoenix LED was awarded the PLASA Members Choice Award in the equipment category. In 2015 the Pegasus LED fresnel line also earned the PLASA Members Choice Award.

References

Electronics companies of the United States
Stage lighting
Electronics companies established in 1953
Manufacturing companies established in 1953